Variations of cream buns or cream rolls exist all around the world. Typically they are made with an enriched dough bread roll that is split after baking and cooling and filled with cream.

Among the numerous international variations are the splits of Devon and Cornwall in southwest England, which are yeasted buns filled with clotted cream, the maritozzi of the Lazio region of Italy, which are enriched buns, made with dried fruit and filled with whipped cream, and the roombroodjes of The Netherlands, which are filled with pastry cream. 

In Northern Europe, soft buns spiced with cardamom, called Semla in Sweden, are eaten on Shrove Tuesday.

Another specific national version is the Hong Kong sweet bun. It is one of the most standard pastries in Hong Kong. It can also be found in most Chinatown bakery shops.  The bun has either butter cream or whipped cream filling down the middle with coconut sprinkles on the outside. Variations of it include the "Cream Horn", a pastry in a spiral shape, much like a horn, filled with cream. 

In India cream buns are sold at most bakeries and grocery stores. They have a wide elliptical shape and they are cut in middle along the major axis. Each of the flat bun surfaces on the inside are filled with cream and joined together.

Gallery

See also
 List of buns
 List of stuffed dishes

References

Buns
Stuffed desserts
Sweet breads